Bridgetown College in Bridgetown, County Wexford, Ireland, is managed by the Wexford and Waterford Education and Training Board.

History
After the enactment of the Vocational Education Act in 1930, an experimental vocational school was established in rented accommodation in Bridgetown village. Enrolment slowly increased and it was not until the 1960s that the need for a proper post-primary school in the area was accepted, and in October 1965, 44 students and five teachers moved from the rented accommodation into a new purpose-built school.

The numbers continued to increase and by 1976, when students sat for the Leaving Cert, for the first time, enrolment stood at 329. To cope with the increasing numbers, a new building was officially opened by the Minister for Education on 12 October 1984. By 2019, the school had now houses a community of 575 students.

In December 2003, Bridgetown College celebrated its 50th anniversary. A booklet was published to commemorate the golden jubilee event.

A building extension started in 2006 and was completed in Summer 2007. The extension has a floor area of 18002 metres and provides additional facilities : eight general classrooms, a new art room, a science laboratory, a tiered demonstration room, a technology room, a senior engineering room, a general purpose and dining area, a new staff room, a new administration area and extra toilet and cloakroom facilities. The extension to the gymnasium was completed on 2 March 2007 with the new building extension completed the following September.

Ethos and courses
Non-denominational, co-educational and non-selective in its intake, the school ethos is broadly Christian.

The school offers the Junior Certificate, Leaving Certificate, Post Leaving Certificate and Evening Courses.

A night-class programme offers a small number with adult classes.

References

External links
 Bridgetown College website

Secondary schools in County Wexford
Education in County Wexford